Giorgos Karafeskos (born 8 December 1946) is a former Greek professional footballer who played as a midfielder, mostly for AEK Athens and a former manager. His nickname was "The Baby".

Club career
Karafeskos started football from an early age, playing in the fields of his neighborhood like most children of that time. At the age of 13, in 1959 Karafeskos went with a friend to the stadium of AEK Athens in Nea Filadelfeia to participate in the trials for the club's academies. His friend was chosen immediately, in contrast to young Karafeskos who was rejected. The trials were also watched by the then coach of the first team, Lukas Aurednik, who, watching the little Karafeskos disappointed, called him by his side and asked him to do various exercises with the ball. Aurednik recognized his talent and urged him to go to the club's office and signed him a sports card. Thus, Karafeskos joined the infrastructure departments of AEK in 1959. Two years later Karafeskos was already a member of the teen  and youth national team.

In 1965, at the age of 18, he made his debut in the men's team of the AEK under the coach Tryfon Tzanetis. He started playing in the position of right winger, but later established himself as a central midfielder while he played several times as a defensive midfielder. Karafeskos young presence in AEK from the infrastructure departments gave him the nickname "Baby" that followed him throughout his football career. Regardless of the position he covered, Karafeskos showed great ease in scoring as he did not leave much room for reaction to the opposing goalkeepers with the "deadly" shots he attempted. Strong personality and unruly character, he adapted his game to the requirements of each match. The coaches of the other teams "sacrificed" two or three players to mark him, but he masterfully opened spaces to his teammates, and helped organize the attack. It was not uncommon for him to start a campaign from the center of the field, reaching the opponent's area. His comfort to maneuver with the ball, his beautiful dribbles, but also the pressing defense he could play, were great elements for the midfield of AEK. He was one of the main of the team that won second place in the Balkans Cup in 1967, losing only in the final by Fenerbahçe. In his career at AEK, he completed 255 appearances with 30 goals in all competitions and won 2 Championships and a Cup, while he was a member of the team that played in the European Cup quarter-finals in 1969.

Karafeskos parted ways with AEK in the summer of 1974, after a misunderstanding, due to a publication that presented him as released and despite the assurance of the president of the club, Loukas Barlos that such a reason did not occur. His idiosyncratic and developed selfishness led him to the mistake, as he publicly admitted, of leaving AEK and moving to Kastoria, where he played until 1978. He then signed to Kallithea, until 1980 when he retired, at the age of 33.

International career
Karafeskos also played in all divisions of the national teams and had 8 appearances with the Men's team between 1968 and 1971, while he was also a member of the military team that in 1967 won the World Military Cup in Baghdad. Decisive role in his establishment as a midfielder was a match of the youth national team against Yugoslavia, where Greece was behind the score with 0–1 and was ordered to mark the opponent's attacking midfielder. Karafeskos "locked" his opponent and contributed the most to the comeback of Greece with 2–1. On 12 October 1968 he debuted with Greece at an away match against Switzerland for the 1970 FIFA World Cup qualifiers.

Managerial career
Since his retirement, Karafeskos has been involved in coaching, obtaining the diploma of the Beta Ethniki. He worked in many amateur clubs in Athens. In the 1993 he worked in Crete and specifically in Poseidon Heraklion for a season, where he managed to win the promotion for the Gamma Ethniki. Immediately after, he returned to AEK as a coach in the reserve team and remained there for 12 years doing a fine job under adverse conditions, alongside Andreas Stamatiadis.

Personal life
Karafeskos is particularly active with the events of the Veterans Association of AEK Athens, while serving under various positions in the academies of the club. His wife, Irene has passed away. He has a daughter, Melina, who is a pilot and lives permanently in New York with her husband and their two children.

On 29 September 2020 Karafeskos donated part of his personal collection to the then under-construction History museum of AEK Athens in the Agia Sophia Stadium. He chose the specific date on purpose, as it was the 49 anniversary of AEK's 3–2 victory against Inter Milan in 1971–72 European Cup.

Honours

AEK Athens
Alpha Ethniki: 1967–68, 1970–71
Greek Cup: 1965–66

Greece Military
World Military Cup: 1967

References

1946 births
Living people
Footballers from Athens
Greek footballers
Greece international footballers
Association football midfielders
AEK Athens F.C. players
Kastoria F.C. players
Kallithea F.C. players
Super League Greece players
AEK Athens F.C. non-playing staff